Riley Edward Robinson (November 4, 1847 - February 1921) was a carpenter, minister in the Episcopal Church, councilman, custom house inspector, and state legislator in Florida. He served on the city council in Fernandina, Florida from 1875 ti 1879 and from 1883 to 1890, as well as from 1892 to 1894. He represented Nassau County, Florida in the Florida House of Representatives in 1883 and 1885.

He was born in Tennessee in 1847. He was described as having been enslaved and categorized as "mulatto". He moved to Alachua County, Florida in 1858 and lived there until after the American Civil War when he moved to Duval County, Florida and apprenticed as a carpenter. He moved to Nassau County in 1870.

He belonged to the mason fraternal order. He was a leader in Nassau County's Republican Party. He was listed as a state legislator as R. E. Robinson. He served as postmaster of the Kings Ferry post office in Nassau County.

The Christian Advocate noted his assigned area.

See also
Samuel Petty

References

1847 births
1921 deaths
Florida city council members
American Freemasons
Republican Party members of the Florida House of Representatives
African-American politicians during the Reconstruction Era
African-American state legislators in Florida
19th-century American politicians
American carpenters
People from Duval County, Florida
American Episcopal clergy
People from Fernandina Beach, Florida
American former slaves
People from Alachua County, Florida